Oleh Mykolayovych Nemchinov (born 1 May 1977) is a Ukrainian civil servant and politician. On 4 March 2020, he was appointed as the Minister of the Cabinet of Ministers.

Biography 
Nemchinov studied at the University of Lviv (1999). He graduated from the Ternopil National Economic University (2003).

Candidate of Sciences in Public Administration.

From 1999 to 2002, he worked at the Lviv City Council. From 2009 to 2010, he also worked in the Lviv Regional State Administration. It is there where he met and worked with future Prime Minister of Ukraine Denys Shmyhal.

From 2003 to 2006, he was an assistant to a People's Deputy of Ukraine.

From 2017 to 2020, Nemchinov served as Secretary of State for the Ministry of Youth and Sports.

On 4 March 2020 Nemchinov was appointed as the Minister of the Cabinet of Ministers in the Shmyhal Government lead by Prime Minister Denys Shmyhal.

See also 
 Shmyhal Government

References

External links 
 

1977 births
Living people
Politicians from Lviv
University of Lviv alumni
Ternopil National Economic University alumni
Ukrainian civil servants
Cabinet Office ministers of Ukraine
Ukrainian People's Party politicians
21st-century Ukrainian politicians
Laureates of the Diploma of the Verkhovna Rada of Ukraine